Coleophora sergiella is a moth of the family Coleophoridae. It is found in France, Spain, the Czech Republic, Austria, Slovakia and Hungary, but also in Mongolia.

The larvae feed on the leaves of Potentilla cinerea var. velutina and possibly Artemisia frigida.

References

sergiella
Moths of Europe
Moths of Asia
Moths described in 1979